Paurito is a small town in the Santa Cruz Department in the South American Andean Plurinational State of Bolivia.

Location 
Paurito is the central town of Cantón Paurito and is located in Santa Cruz Municipality in Andrés Ibáñez Province. It is situated at an elevation of 356 m fourteen kilometers west of Río Grande, one of the largest rivers in the Bolivian lowlands.

Roads 
Paurito is located 27 kilometers south-east of the departmental capital Santa Cruz.
From Santa Cruz the tarmac road Ruta 4/Ruta 9 goes 18 km east to Cotoca and then to Puerto Pailas where it crosses the Río Grande and reaches Pailón on the river's eastern banks. From Pailón, Ruta 4 goes further east for another 587 km before it reaches Puerto Suárez on the Brazilian border, while Ruta 9 goes north to Guayaramerin after 1175 km.
At Cotoca, a dirt road leaves the Rutas 4/9 in a southern direction and reaches Paurito after sixteen kilometers.

Population 
The population of the place has increased rapidly over the past two decades as the following table shows:

Due to the population movements over the past decades, the region has a certain amount of Quechua population, in the Santa Cruz Municipality 12.0 percent of the population speak the Quechua language.

References

External links
Map of Andrés Ibáñez Province

Populated places in Santa Cruz Department (Bolivia)